Summercon is one of the oldest hacker conventions. The longest running such conference in the United States is the annual (except for 2020 due to Covid restrictions) The Hackers Conference. It helped set a precedent for more modern "cons" such as H.O.P.E. and DEF CON, although it has remained smaller and more personal. Summercon has been hosted in cities such as Pittsburgh, St. Louis, Atlanta, Washington, D.C., New York City, Austin, Las Vegas, and Amsterdam. Originally run by Phrack, the underground ezine, and held annually in St. Louis, the organizational responsibilities of running Summercon were transferred to clovis in 1998 and the convention took place in Atlanta, dubbed 'Summercon X'.

In its modern incarnation, it is currently organized by redpantz and shmeck, who emphasize the importance of face-to-face interaction as technology increasingly mediates relationships between members of the information security community. Summercon is open to everyone, including "hackers, phreakers, phrackers, feds, 2600 kids, cops, security professionals, U4EA, r00t kids club, press, groupies, chicks, conference whores, k0d3 kids, convicted felons, and concerned parents."

See also
 Chaos Communication Congress (C3) — oldest and Europe's biggest hacker conferences held by Chaos Computer Club (CCC).
 HoHoCon — first modern hacker convention held by CULT OF THE DEAD COW.
 Black Hat Briefings the largest 'official' computer security event in the world.
 MyDEFCON gathering point spawned from the annual DEFCON security conference.

References

External links
  Summercon Official site
 Phrack, Volume Three, Issue Thirty-one, Phile #5 of 10. References Summercon '88
 An interview with Loyd Blankenship, aka The Mentor, reflecting on Summercon '88

Hacker conventions